Heroes of the West may refer to:

 Heroes of the West (1932 film), an American Western serial
 Heroes of the West (1965 film), an Italian Spaghetti Western
 Heroes of the West (Red Orchestra 2 mod), a modification for the video game Red Orchestra 2